The 2015 Gemdale ATP Challenger China International Shenzhen was a professional tennis tournament played on hard courts. It was the second edition of the tournament which was part of the 2015 ATP Challenger Tour. It took place in Shenzhen, China between 16 and 22 March 2015.

Singles main draw entrants

Seeds

 1 Rankings are as of March 9, 2015

Other entrants
The following players received wildcards into the singles main draw:
  Li Zhe
  Gao Xin
  Wang Chuhan
  Wu Di

The following players received entry from the qualifying draw:
  Yasutaka Uchiyama
  Richard Becker
  Sanam Singh
  Yang Tsung-hua

Champions

Singles

 Blaž Kavčič def.  André Ghem, 7–5, 6–4

Doubles

 Gero Kretschmer /  Alexander Satschko def.  Saketh Myneni /  Divij Sharan, 6–1, 3–6, [10–2]

References
 Singles Main Draw

External links

Gemdale ATP Challenger China International Shenzhen
Pingshan Open
2015 in Chinese tennis